Lilian Mukobwanakawe (born 6 January 1989) is a Rwandese Paralympic volleyballer who as of 2019 serves as the captain of the Rwanda Women Sitting Volleyball team. She was captain of the 2015 and 2019 ParaVolley Africa Sitting Volleyball Championships winning teams.

Background and education 
Mukobwanakawe is the last of seven children born to Emmanuel Karangwa and Agnes Uwiregye in Kamonyi District, Southern Province, Rwanda. She attended Remera Catholic School for her primary education before joining ASPAD Ngororero for the Ordinary level and completed her Advanced level in 2009 at Saint Bernadette still in Kamonyi District. 
Mukobwanakawe was born with full function of her limbs but sustained an accident at the age of seven that left her with a broken right femur. She did not realize it was serious because she could still walk freely and play basketball. Later on in high school, she sustained a further injury during an inter-school basketball competition and since 2005, has not been able to walk without the aid of crutches.

Career 
According to the New Times, a Rwandese daily, Mukobwanakawe was introduced to sitting volleyball, a sport in the Paralympic Games, in 2007, and was recruited by a team called Imena. She left Imena a year later and joined the Nyarugenge-based Troupe Handicapee Tuzuzanye (THT) Club where she also played for one year before crossing to Intwari in Kicukiro where she was appointed captain and later the club vice president, roles she holds to date.

She has since gone ahead to represent her country at the 2016 Intercontinental and World ParaVolley Championship was held between March 17-23 in Hangzhou City, China.

Paralympic qualification 
Mukobwanakawe made her Paralympic debut at the 2016 Rio Olympics after being a part of it.

She is part of the Rwanda Women's Sitting Volleyball Team that qualified for the Tokyo 2020 Summer Paralympics after the final round of the 2019 African Sitting Volleyball Championships  by beating Egypt 3-1(25-22, 26-28, 15-25, 18-25)  at Amahoro Petit Stadium.

Individual awards

She was voted the best spiker at the 2019 African Sitting Volleyball Championships.

[[Category:== References ==]]

1989 births
Living people
Women's sitting volleyball players
Paralympic volleyball players

Rwandan sportswomen
Volleyball in Rwanda